Jordan Matechuk (born September 22, 1985) is a professional Canadian football linebacker and long snapper who recently played for the BC Lions of the Canadian Football League. He played junior football for the Regina Thunder, Winnipeg Rifles and Victoria Rebels.  He was signed by the Blue Bombers as an undrafted free agent in 2007. Matechuk was signed by the Hamilton Tiger-Cats in 2008 and was released before the 2011 season after spending three seasons with the club.  On February 14, 2012, Matechuk once again signed with the Winnipeg Blue Bombers.

External links
BC Lions bio 

1985 births
BC Lions players
Canadian football linebackers
Canadian football long snappers
Canadian Junior Football League players
Hamilton Tiger-Cats players
Living people
Players of Canadian football from Saskatchewan
Saskatchewan Roughriders players
Sportspeople from Yorkton
Winnipeg Blue Bombers players